William Francis Sullivan (born June 15, 1957) is an American jurist and lawyer. He is an associate justice for the Massachusetts Superior Court.

Early life and education
He was born on June 15, 1957 in Boston, Massachusetts. Sullivan graduated from Xaverian Brothers High School in Westwood, Massachusetts. He then received his undergraduate degree from the University of Notre Dame and his J.D. from the Boston College Law School.

Career
Prior to his judicial career, Sullivan was a partner at his firm of Sullivan and Sweeney, LLP in Quincy, Massachusetts. He also previously served as a special assistant city solicitor for Quincy from 2006 to 2008 and as a prosecutor for the Norfolk County, Massachusetts District Attorney’s Office from 1982 to 1984.  He was nominated to the state superior court by former Governor Deval Patrick (D) in April 2014, and his nomination was confirmed by the Governor's Council on May 21, 2014. Sullivan may serve on the court until he reaches the mandatory retirement age of 70.

Personal life
He and his Mary Lou have three children.

External links
The Massachusetts Court System, "Superior Court Justices"
The Massachusetts Court System, "Superior Court Division"
The Massachusetts Court System, "Massachusetts Courthouses by County"

References

Living people
People from Boston
Massachusetts Superior Court justices
Xaverian Brothers High School alumni
University of Notre Dame alumni
Boston College Law School alumni
1957 births
21st-century American lawyers
20th-century American lawyers
21st-century American judges
Massachusetts lawyers